The finals and the qualifying heats of the Men's 100 metres Freestyle event at the 1993 FINA Short Course World Championships were held on 3 December 1993 in Palma de Mallorca, Spain.

Finals

Qualifying heats

See also
1992 Men's Olympic Games 100m Freestyle
1993 Men's European LC Championships 100m Freestyle

References
 Results
 swimrankings

F